Ciments français (english "French Cement") is a French-based manufacturer of cement and has been a subsidiary of  Italcementi Group since 1992.  The company was created in 1850 by Émile Dupond and Charles Demarle in Boulogne-sur-Mer.

External links
 Official Web Site

French companies established in 1992